Entrega Total (Give in Your All) is a studio album by Mexican pop band OV7. The album was nominated "Latin Pop Album of the Year by a Duo or Group" and "Latin Pop Album of the Year by a New Artist" at the 1999 Billboard Latin Music Awards. The contains the lead single "Te Quiero Tanto, Tanto" from the Mexican telenovela Mi pequeña traviesa (1997).

Track listing
The information from AllMusic.

References

1998 albums
OV7 albums
Spanish-language albums
Sony Discos albums